Hazen Camp is a shelter maintained and operated by Parks Canada. It contains many all-weather shelters for the park staff. The visiting researchers set up tents in the camp area. Its coordinates are 81°49'15.22'N 71°21'14.11'W

History
Hazen Camp was originally established in 1957-1958 for Operation Hazen. It was one of the most comprehensive science research projects ever in the Canadian High Arctic. Today, Hazen Camp is used as a Warden Station and an access point to Quttinirpaaq National Park.

Geography
Hazen Camp is situated half way along the north shore of Lake Hazen. The closest settlement is Tanquary Fiord. McGill Mountain is very close to the station, rising 1000m into the sky.

Notes

External links
 Operation Hazen Characteristics of Soils of the Hazen Camp Area (1963)

Extreme points of Earth
Ellesmere Island
Populated places in Arctic Canada
Populated places in the Qikiqtaaluk Region